"Dreaming with a Broken Heart" is a song by John Mayer from his 2006 album Continuum. It was released as digital download single in July 2007.

The single entered the U.S Billboard Hot 100 chart at its peak position of #99. It also peaked on the Adult Top 40 at #8, making it Mayer's eighth single to enter the Top 10 on Billboard's Adult Top 40 Chart.

Billboard called the song "Another bull's-eye from that rare singer/songwriter who has proved to be a cinch for success."

In October 2007, the song was featured prominently in "The Trey Wiggs Taps Back Episode", a second-season episode of the CW/BET comedy-drama television series The Game.

Mia Michaels choreographed a contemporary routine with Twitch and Kherington to this song in the fourth season of So You Think You Can Dance. Penn Masala covered this song in their seventh album, Panoramic.

Cover versions

Daniel Evans, a finalist on The X Factor (UK) covered this on his YouTube channel in June 2013 and was subsequently featured on his 2013 EP, "Reflections".

Charts

Weekly charts

Year-end charts

Certifications

References

2007 singles
John Mayer songs
Songs written by John Mayer
Pop ballads
Rock ballads
2006 songs